Paraphilaeus is a genus of the jumping spiders found in Queensland and New South Wales. It contains only one species, Paraphilaeus daemeli. Though it has been known for a long time, in 2003, closer investigation showed that it represents a new genus and is neither related to Plexippus nor Trite. The genus name is derived from Ancient Greek para "alongside" and the salticid genus Philaeus.

They are 4–6 mm in length. The male palpal bulb has a very elongate cymbium, its outer half distinctly curved. The embolus is very long, passing across the ventral surface of the tegulum and along the edge of cymbium.

References

  (2007): The world spider catalog, version 8.0. American Museum of Natural History.
  (2003): Salticidae (Arachnida, Araneae) from Oriental, Australian and Pacific Regions, Xvii. Paraphilaeus, A New Genus From Australia  ANNALES ZOOLOGICI (Warszawa), 2003, 53(4): 489-507.
  (2010) Paraphilaeus daemeli (Keyserling, 1883) Daemel's Trite description and photos, including male and female genitalia.

Salticidae
Spiders of Australia
Monotypic Salticidae genera